John Quinn (born September 8, 1950) is a farmer and former Republican member of the Missouri House of Representatives.  He resides in Chillicothe, Missouri, with his wife Mary and has four daughters.  He is Catholic.

He was born in Marceline, Missouri, and graduated in 1968 from St. Joseph Academy.  He then went on to attend Northwest Missouri State University and the University of Missouri.  He has been a self-employed farmer for thirty years.

He is a member of the Knights of Columbus, a past county president of the Farm Bureau, past chair of the Livingston County Soil & Water Board, a board member of the Missouri Corn Growers Association, the Missouri Soybean Association, Show-Me Quality Grain, the Chillichothe Chamber of Commerce, Ducks Unlimited, and the National Rifle Association.

He was first elected to the Missouri House of Representatives in a special election in 2001, winning reelection in 2002 and 2004.  He currently serves on the following committees:
Appropriations - Agriculture and Natural Resources (chair),
Agriculture Policy,
Budget,
Corrections and Public Institutions.

References
Official Manual, State of Missouri, 2005-2006.  Jefferson City, MO: Secretary of State.

1950 births
Living people
People from Chillicothe, Missouri
People from Marceline, Missouri
Northwest Missouri State University alumni
University of Missouri alumni
Farmers from Missouri
Republican Party members of the Missouri House of Representatives